Robert Charles "Rob" Duhamel (1954/1955 – September 2021) was a Jersey politician. He served as a member of the States of Jersey between 1993 and 2014, and as Planning and Environment Minister.

Biography
Duhamel was first elected to the States in 1993 in St. Saviour District 1. He was re-elected in 1996, 1999, 2002, 2005, 2008 and 2011. He lost his seat in the 2014 elections.

References

External links

1950s births
Year of birth missing
2021 deaths
Deputies of Jersey
Government ministers of Jersey
People from Saint Saviour, Jersey